Jozef Turza (born July 24, 1972 in Komárno) is a Czechoslovak sprint canoer who competed in the early 1990s. He finished fourth in the K-4 1000 m event at the 1992 Summer Olympics in Barcelona.

References
 Sports-Reference.com profile

1972 births
Canoeists at the 1992 Summer Olympics
Czechoslovak male canoeists
Slovak male canoeists
Living people
Olympic canoeists of Czechoslovakia
Sportspeople from Komárno